Apache Pizza is a chain of fast food pizza delivery restaurants in Ireland. Founded in 1996 by Robert Pendleton and his wife Emily Gore Grimes, Apache is the trading name of The Good Food Company. As of 2022, there are over 160 stores across the Republic of Ireland and 20 stores in Northern Ireland. Apache is Ireland's largest pizza chain. Its Managing Director is Martin Lyons.

Expansion
In 2015, Apache signed an agreement with Marvin.ie, an online fast food order service similar to Just Eat. As of 2012, the company employs over 800 people and manufactures more than 160,000 pizza dough balls per month.

In March 2018, Spanish restaurant chain Telepizza announced a joint venture with Irish Burger King franchise arm OKR to purchase a majority share of the company.

Awards
In 2014, Fox News listed Apache as one of the best pizza chains in the world. Just Eat named Apache as Ireland's best takeaway in 2015.

References

Fast-food chains of Ireland
Restaurants in the Republic of Ireland
Restaurant chains in Ireland
Irish companies established in 1996
Retail companies of the Republic of Ireland
Restaurants established in 1996
Pizza franchises